Puttin' It Together is an album by American jazz drummer Elvin Jones. It is his first effort for Blue Note as a leader, and the first to feature his trio with saxophonist/flautist Joe Farrell and bassist Jimmy Garrison. It was recorded & released in 1968.

Reception 
The Allmusic review by Scott Yanow awarded the album 4 stars and stated "Joe Farrell did some of his finest playing while with drummer Elvin Jones' trio during 1968-69... With Jones pushing him and Garrison sounding quite advanced, Farrell was consistently inspired to play at the peak of his creativity".

Track listing 
 "Reza" (Ruy Guerra, Edu Lobo) - 7:14
 "Sweet Little Maia" (Jimmy Garrison) - 7:54
 "Keiko's Birthday March" (Elvin Jones) - 6:55
 "Village Greene" (Billy Greene) - 5:13
 "Jay-Ree" (Joe Farrell) - 3:52
 "For Heaven's Sake" (Elise Bretton, Sherman Edwards, Donald Meyer) - 5:10
 "Ginger Bread Boy" (Jimmy Heath) - 5:18

Personnel 
 Elvin Jones - drums
 Joe Farrell - tenor saxophone, soprano saxophone, flute, piccolo
 Jimmy Garrison - bass

References 

Blue Note Records albums
Elvin Jones albums
1968 albums
Albums recorded at Van Gelder Studio
Albums produced by Duke Pearson